Manara, Nepal  is a village development committee in Mahottari District in the Janakpur Zone of south-eastern Nepal. At the time of the 1991 Nepal census it had a population of 5198 people living in 891 individual households.  This census was taken in 1991, and since then (about 15 years from then)  the population of Manara has seen a huge population decrease.

References

External links
UN map of the municipalities of Mahottari District

Populated places in Mahottari District